Reuben Whallon (December 7, 1776 – April 15, 1843) was an American businessman and politician who served one term as a U.S. Representative from New York from 1833 to 1835.

Biography 
Born in Bedminster, New Jersey, Whallon attended the common schools.
He moved to Argyle, Washington County, New York.
He was appointed Justice of the Peace for the township of Argyle March 13, 1806, and served until 1811.

He moved to Essex, New York, in 1814.
He was a large landowner, farmer, merchant, mill owner, and ironmaster.
He served as captain and major in the New York State Militia in 1803–1814.
He served as member of the State assembly in 1808, 1809, and 1811.
Supervisor of the town of Essex in 1818, 1819, 1827, and 1828.
First judge of Essex County Court of Common Pleas 1831–1838.

Congress 
Whallon was elected as a Jacksonian to the Twenty-third Congress (March 4, 1833 – March 3, 1835).
He served as chairman of the Committee on Expenditures on Public Buildings (Twenty-third Congress).

Later career and death 
He again engaged in his former business pursuits.

He died on his estate at Whallons Bay, town of Essex, New York, on April 15, 1843.
He was interred in Whallons Bay Cemetery.

Sources

1776 births
1843 deaths
American militia officers
Jacksonian members of the United States House of Representatives from New York (state)
19th-century American politicians
People from Bedminster, New Jersey
People from Argyle, New York
People from Essex, New York
Burials in New York (state)
Members of the United States House of Representatives from New York (state)